The Borough Council of Wellingborough in Northamptonshire, UK was elected every four years. After  the last boundary changes in 1999, thirty-six councillors were elected from 16 wards. The council was abolished in 2021, with the area becoming part of North Northamptonshire.

Political control
From the first elections to the council in 1973 until its abolition in 2021, political control of the council was held by the following parties:

Leadership
The leaders of the council from 1991 until the council's abolition in 2021 were:

Council elections
1973 Wellingborough Borough Council election
1976 Wellingborough Borough Council election
1979 Wellingborough Borough Council election
1983 Wellingborough Borough Council election (New ward boundaries)
1987 Wellingborough Borough Council election
1991 Wellingborough Borough Council election
1995 Wellingborough Borough Council election
1999 Wellingborough Borough Council election (New ward boundaries increased the number of seats by 2)
2003 Wellingborough Borough Council election
2007 Wellingborough Borough Council election
2011 Wellingborough Borough Council election
2015 Wellingborough Borough Council election (New ward boundaries)

Election results

Borough  result maps

By-election results

1995-1999

2003-2007

2007-2011

2011-2015

2015-2021

References

By-election results

External links
Wellingborough Borough Council

 
Council elections in Northamptonshire
District council elections in England